Tetrahydroxydiboron is a chemical reagent which can be used to prepare boronic acids.

Synthesis
The reaction of boron trichloride with alcohols was reported in 1931, and was used to prepare dimethoxyboron chloride, B(OCH3)2Cl. Egon Wiberg and Wilhelm Ruschmann used it to prepare tetrahydroxydiboron by first introducing the boron–boron bond by reduction with sodium and then hydrolysing the resulting tetramethoxydiboron, B2(OCH3)4, to produce what they termed sub-boric acid. The methanol used in this process can be recycled:

BCl3   ->[\text{+ } \ce{CH3OH}][- \text{ } \ce{HCl}]   B(OCH3)2Cl   ->[\text{+ } \ce{Na}][- \text{ } \ce{NaCl}]   B2(OCH3)4   ->[\text{+ } \ce{H2O}][- \text{ } \ce{CH3OH}]   B2(OH)4

Overall: 2 BCl3 + 2 Na + 4 H2O → B2(OH)4 + 2 NaCl + 4 HCl

Reactions
When heated to over 90 °C, tetrahydroxydiboron dehydrates to a polymeric boron(II) oxide. The temperature must rise to 220 °C to be totally free from water.

Tetrahydroxydiboron is a reducing agent. A water solution slowly gives off hydrogen gas.

References 

Boron compounds
Hydroxides